Alagie Sarr (born 14 December 1999) is a Gambian footballer who played as a midfielder for Gambia Ports Authority FC.

References

1999 births
Living people
Gambian footballers
Association football midfielders
Gambia Ports Authority FC players
The Gambia international footballers